Kamrul may refer to:

Kamrul Ahsan, Bangladeshi diplomat
Kamrul Hasan Bhuiyan (1952–2018), Bangladeshi Major in the Bangladesh Army
Kamrul Hasan or Quamrul Hassan (1921–1988), Bengali artist
Kazi Kamrul Hassan (born 1961), retired Bangladesh Navy commodore, former MD of Khulna Shipyard
SM Kamrul Hassan, two-star general of the Bangladesh Army
Kamrul Islam Imon (born 1986), aka "Imon", Bangladeshi first-class and List A cricketer
Kamrul Islam (Physician), Bangladeshi doctor who won the Independence Award in 2022
Kazi Kamrul Islam (born 1987), Bangladeshi first-class cricketer
Kamrul Laila Jolly, Bangladesh Awami League politician and MP
K. M. Kamrul Kader (born 1964), Bangladeshi justice of the High Court Division Supreme Court of Bangladesh
Kamrul Asraf Khan (born 1960), Bangladeshi businessman, former independent politician and MP
Kamrul Hasan Khan, Vice Chancellor of Bangabandhu Sheikh Mujib Medical University
Kamrul Islam Rabbi (born 1991), Bangladeshi cricketer